Epermenia illigerella is a moth of the  family Epermeniidae. It is known from most of Europe (except the Iberian Peninsula and the western and southern part of the Balkan Peninsula), as well as western Siberia and the Altai region.
 
The wingspan is 12–13 mm.

The larvae feed on the leaves of Aegopodium podagrariae.

References

External links
lepiforum.de

Epermeniidae
Moths of Europe
Moths described in 1813
Moths of Asia